Parapsestis lichenea is a moth in the family Drepanidae. It was described by George Hampson in 1893. It is found in Sikkim in India, Myanmar, Thailand, Vietnam and the Chinese provinces of Henan, Shaanxi, Zhejiang, Hubei, Fujian, Sichuan, Yunnan and Tibet.

The wingspan is about 38 mm. The forewings are whitish grey, crossed by numerous waved dark lines. There are indistinct antemedial, postmedial and submarginal curved dark bands and the orbicular and reniform spots are indistinct, the former figure-of-8 shaped, the latter elongate. There is also an oblique black apical streak and a marginal lunulate line. The hindwings are white with an indistinct medial fuscous line and a broad blackish marginal band.

Subspecies
Parapsestis lichenea lichenea (India: Sikkim)
Parapsestis lichenea splendida Laszlo, G. Ronkay, L. Ronkay & Witt, 2007 (Myanmar, Thailand, Vietnam, China: Yunnan, Tibet)
Parapsestis lichenea tsinlinga Laszlo, G. Ronkay, L. Ronkay & Witt, 2007 (China: Henan, Shaanxi, Zhejiang, Hubei, Fujian, Sichuan)

References

Moths described in 1893
Thyatirinae
Moths of Asia